Scanlon is a surname of Irish Gaelic origin.

Scanlon may also refer to:

Places
 Scanlon, Minnesota, United States
 Scanlon Farm, an historic site in West Virginia, United States

Other
 8131 Scanlon, a main-belt asteroid
 Scanlon plan, a gainsharing program
 , a US Navy cargo ship in commission from 1918 to 1919

See also
 Atascadero State Hospital v. Scanlon, a 1985 United States Supreme Court case
 Brooks-Scanlon Corporation 1, a steam locomotive in Pennsylvania, USA
 
 Scanlan (disambiguation)